Rotterdam Delftsche Poort was a railway station of the Hollandsche IJzeren Spoorweg-Maatschappij in Rotterdam, Netherlands located on the Oude Lijn from Amsterdam Willemspoort station to Rotterdam. The station was located east of the present-day Rotterdam Centraal.

History 
The first station Delftsche Poort opened in 1847 completing the railway line between Amsterdam and Rotterdam. The station was designed by Frederik Willem Conrad.

The second station Delftsche Poort opened in 1877 connection the Rotterdam with Dordrecht.  This station was located slightly north-west to the former station.

See also 
 Rotterdam Centraal railway station

Delftsche Poort
Railway stations opened in 1847
Railway stations closed in 1940
1847 establishments in the Netherlands

Railway stations in the Netherlands opened in 1847